Tenascin C (TN-C) is a glycoprotein that in humans is encoded by the TNC gene. It is expressed in the extracellular matrix of various tissues during development, disease or injury, and in restricted neurogenic areas of the central nervous system. Tenascin-C is the founding member of the tenascin protein family. In the embryo it is made by migrating cells like the neural crest; it is also abundant in developing tendons, bone and cartilage.

Gene and expression 
The human tenascin C  gene, TN-C, is located on chromosome 9 with location of the cytogenic band at the 9q33. The entire Tenascin family coding region spans approximately 80 kilobases translating into 2203 amino acids.

Expression of TN-C changes from development to adulthood. TN-C is highly expressed during embryogenesis and is briefly expressed during organogenesis, while in developed organs, expression is absent or in trace amounts. TN-C has been shown to be upregulated under pathological conditions caused by inflammation, infection, tumorigenesis, and at sites that are subject to unique biomechanics forces.

The regulation of TN-C is induced or repressed by a number of different factors that are expressed during embryonic tissue, as well as developed tissues during remodeling, injured, or neoplastic. TGF-β1, tumor necrosis factor-α, interleukin-1, nerve growth factor, and keratinocyte growth factor are factors that have been shown to regulate TN-C. Other extracellular matrix components such as matrix metalloproteins and integrins are also frequently co-expressed with TN-C.

In the developing central nervous system, TN-C is involved in regulating the proliferation of both oligodendrocyte precursor cells and astrocytes. Expression of TN-C by radial glia precedes the onset of gliogenesis, during which time it is thought to drive the differentiation of astrocytes.
In the adult brain, TN-C expression is downregulated except for the areas that maintain neurogenesis into adulthood and the hypothalamus.
TN-C is also present in central nervous system injuries and gliomas.

Structure 
Tenascin C is an oligomeric glycoprotein composed of individual polypeptides with molecular weights ranging from 180 to ~300kDa. The Tenascin family of proteins shares a similar structural pattern. These similar modules include heptad repeats, EGF-like repeats, fibronectin type III domains, and a C-terminal globular domain shared with fibrinogens. These protein modules are lined up like beads on a string and give rise to long and extended molecules. At the N-terminus each Tenascin has an oligomerization domain which in the case of TN-C leads to the formation of hexamers.  TN-C and -R are known to be subject to alternative splicing. In human TN-C there exists, in addition to the eight constant repeats, nine extra repeats subject to alternative splicing. This results in a multitude of TN-C subunits differing in the number and identity of fibronectin type III domain repeats.

Interactions 
Tenascin-C has been shown to interact with fibronectin. This interaction is shown to have the potential to modify cell adhesion. A solid-state interaction between fibronectin and TN-C results in cellular upregulation of matrix metalloproteinase expression.

TN-C also interacts with one or more TN-C receptors on cells which activate and repress the same signal transduction pathway.  An example of this interaction is the adhesion of SW80 carcinoma cells to the third FN-III repeat of TN-C via the αvβ3 integrin receptor leads to cell spreading, phosphorylation of focal adhesion kinase, paxillin and ERK2 MAPK, and proliferation. In contrast, when these same cells use either α9β1 or αvβ6 integrins to adhere to the same third FN type III repeat, cell spreading is attenuated and activation of these signaling mediators and cell growth is suppressed or fails to occur.

Function 
Tenascin C is a very diverse protein that can produce different functions within the same cell type.  These myriad functions are accomplished through alternative splicing of mRNA as well as the temporal activation of signal transduction pathways and/or target genes at different stages of growth or differentiation.  TN-C is classified as an adhesion-modulating protein, because it has been found to inhibit cellular adhesion to fibronectin.

Much of the functional studies are inferred from various TN-C knockout mice models.  TN-C clearly plays a role in cell signaling as evidenced by its ability to be induced during events such as trauma, inflammation, or cancer development.  Also, TN-C is important in regulating cell proliferation and migration, especially during developmental differentiation and wound healing.

Clinical significance 
Tenascin C continues to be researched as a potential biomarker for a number of diseases such as myocarditis and different forms of cancer.  The numerous involvements with cellular functioning and signaling make TN-C a popular protein to study in developing new therapies and detection methods.    
Recent work has shown that TN-C inhibits HIV infection in immune cells by binding to a chemokine coreceptor site on the HIV-1 envelope protein, blocking the virus' entry into the host cells.

Role in cancer
Tenascin C is implicated in a number of different cancers such as osteosarcomas, chondrosarcomas, bladder cancer, and glioblastomas. In glioblastoma cells, Tenascin-C expression provides much clinical and functional significance in terms of cancer prognosis and tumor progression. The endogenous pool of tenascin-C isoforms in gliomas supports both tumor cell proliferation and migration. Because tenascin-C is essential to the survival of these various forms of cancers, tenascin-c expression could be a potential biomarker for cancer detection.  Also, tenascin-C antibodies have been used to diagnose and create therapies for many different types of cancers.

See also 
 Tenascin

References

Further reading

Tenascins